Thornton is a town in Grafton County, New Hampshire, United States. The population was 2,708 at the 2020 census, up from 2,490 at the 2010 census.

History 
Thornton was incorporated on July 6, 1763, and named for Doctor Matthew Thornton, a signer of the Declaration of Independence.

Geography 
The Pemigewasset River crosses the west side of the town and drains the town via its tributaries Eastman Brook, Mill Brook, Hubbard Brook, the Mad River, and others. Via the Pemigewasset, the town is part of the Merrimack River watershed.

The White Mountain National Forest covers most of the eastern side of the town.

Demographics 

At the 2000 census there were 1,843 people, 759 households, and 507 families living in the town.  The population density was 36.6 people per square mile (14.1/km).  There were 1,487 housing units at an average density of 29.5 per square mile (11.4/km).  The racial makeup of the town was 97.61% White, 0.27% African American, 0.11% Native American, 0.27% Asian, 0.05% Pacific Islander, 0.33% from other races, and 1.36% from two or more races. Hispanic or Latino of any race were 0.71%.

Of the 759 households 29.6% had children under the age of 18 living with them, 56.5% were married couples living together, 6.6% had a female householder with no husband present, and 33.2% were non-families. 21.1% of households were one person and 6.6% were one person aged 65 or older.  The average household size was 2.43 and the average family size was 2.86.

The age distribution was 22.4% under the age of 18, 7.5% from 18 to 24, 33.1% from 25 to 44, 24.6% from 45 to 64, and 12.4% 65 or older.  The median age was 38 years. For every 100 females, there were 99.2 males.  For every 100 females age 18 and over, there were 102.5 males.

The median household income was $38,380 and the median family income  was $45,172. Males had a median income of $27,750 versus $22,938 for females. The per capita income for the town was $18,478.  About 6.9% of families and 9.5% of the population were below the poverty line, including 13.5% of those under age 18 and 3.0% of those age 65 or over.

Notable people 

 Moses Cheney (1793–1875), 19th century abolitionist
 Karl Drerup (1904–2000), German-American enamels artist
 Orison Swett Marden (1848–1924), hotelier, author
 Nevin S. Scrimshaw (1918–2013), nutritionist, winner of World Food Prize

References

External links 
 
 New Hampshire Economic and Labor Market Information Bureau Profile

Towns in Grafton County, New Hampshire
Towns in New Hampshire